Takanomine Akihiko (born 23 January 1959 as Akihiko Okazaki) is a former sumo wrestler from Mizumaki, Fukuoka, Japan. He made his professional debut in September 1974 and reached the top division in May 1989. His highest rank was maegashira 12. He left the sumo world upon retirement from active competition in May 1991.

Career record

See also
Glossary of sumo terms
List of past sumo wrestlers

References

1959 births
Living people
Japanese sumo wrestlers
Sumo people from Fukuoka Prefecture